The Belgian national volleyball team is a team of volleyball players that represents Belgium at international championships.
Belgium won the European League title for the first time in impressive in 2013 as they swept the Czech Republic and Croatia in the semifinal and gold medal match respectively. Belgium in 2014 was their first World Championship outing since 1978 and they have largely been restricted to competing at European level.

Competitive record

World Championship

World League

European Championship

European Volleyball League
 Champions   Runners-up   Third place   Fourth place

Current squad
The following is the Belgian roster in the 2019 European Championship.

Head coach:  Dominique Baeyens

References

External links
Official website
FIVB profile

Volleyball
Volleyball in Belgium
National men's volleyball teams
Men's sport in Belgium